The  (lit. San Juan Senators) was a professional baseball team based in San Juan, Puerto Rico.

The Senadores club was founded in 1938 and played intermittently in the Liga de Béisbol Profesional de Puerto Rico, the predecessor to the current Liga de Béisbol Profesional Roberto Clemente.

For the 1984–1985 season, they were rechristened as the Metros de San Juan, a name that they conserved until the 1993–1994 tournament. The team was sold in 2004 and subsequently relocated to Arecibo. In 2010 they returned to San Juan.

The franchise won eight league titles in its storied history, and also claimed the 1995 Caribbean Series championship, with an undefeated record of 6–0, under manager Luis Meléndez.

The Senadores de San Juan were expelled for the 2011-12 season, but have since continued to play.

1995 Dream Team
In 1995, the Senadores de San Juan assembled one of the strongest teams in the history of the Caribbean Series. The group, which was dubbed Dream Team, featured Major League Baseball players in most positions, counting with a lineup that included:
Roberto Alomar
Carlos Baerga
Ricky Bones
Carlos Delgado
Juan González
Roberto Hernández
Carmelo Martínez
Edgar Martínez
Rey Sánchez
Rubén Sierra
Bernie Williams

See also
Lobos de Arecibo
Senadores de San Juan players

Sources

External links
 
 

1938 establishments in Puerto Rico
Baseball teams established in 1938
Defunct baseball teams in Puerto Rico
Liga de Béisbol Profesional Roberto Clemente
Professional baseball teams in Puerto Rico
Sports in San Juan, Puerto Rico